Mound Valley may refer to:

Mound Valley, Kansas
Mound Valley Township, Labette County, Kansas